William Shockley (born September 17, 1963) is an American actor and musician.

He was born in Lawrence, Kansas. He graduated from Texas Tech University with a degree in political science. He appeared mainly in TV series; he is best known for his role as Hank Lawson on Dr. Quinn, Medicine Woman.

Filmography

Film

Television

References

External links
 
 William Shockley – TV Guide

1963 births
Male actors from Kansas
American male film actors
American male television actors
Texas Tech University alumni
People from Lawrence, Kansas
Living people